Joanna Drew CBE (1929–2003) was an English art gallery director and arts administrator. She worked for the Arts Council for nearly four decades, and was director of the Hayward Gallery from 1987 until 1992. She was once described as "unquestionably the most important individual in the British art scene".

Life
Joanna Drew was born in India, the daughter of Brigadier Francis Greville Drew, later military governor of Eritrea, and the artist Sannie Drew. She was educated at Edinburgh Ladies' College  and Dartington Hall before studying a course in the history and practice of art taught jointly by the University of Edinburgh and Edinburgh College of Art. Drew joined the Arts Council in 1952 as an exhibition organizer. She helped organize Fernando Gamboa's 1953 exhibition of Mexican art at the Tate Gallery, and went on to organize the 1960 Picasso exhibition (where takings were too large to count at the end of the day), the 1964 Miró exhibition and the 1968 Henry Moore exhibition at the Tate.

References

1929 births
2003 deaths
People educated at the Mary Erskine School
Alumni of the University of Edinburgh
Alumni of the Edinburgh College of Art
British arts administrators
Women arts administrators
British art curators
Commanders of the Order of the British Empire